Shōichirō, Shoichiro or Shouichirou (written: 正一郎, 昭一郎, 章一郞, 翔一郎 or 翔一朗) is a masculine Japanese given name. Notable people with the name include:

, Japanese engineer and businessman
, Japanese judoka
, Japanese mathematician
, Japanese footballer
, Japanese long-distance runner
, Japanese chief executive

Japanese masculine given names